Faisal Moosa Mamlekar Shaikh, (born 2 December 1977) is a first-class cricketer who played for Goa and Mumbai in the Ranji Trophy. He was born in Bombay, Maharashtra. Faisal is a right-hand batsman and right-arm offbreak bowler.

Faisal began his domestic career for Mumbai, playing two first-class matches during the 1997–98 Ranji Trophy. He returned to the national level in 2002, representing Goa. It was one of three five-wicket hauls that Skaikh took in the 2002–03 Ranji Trophy.

Teams
Ranji Trophy: Goa, Mumbai

References 

Goa cricketers
Living people
1977 births
Cricketers from Mumbai
Indian cricketers